São João, Portuguese for "Saint John", may refer to:

Architecture
Forte de São João (disambiguation)
Capela de São João Batista (Chapel of St. John the Baptist), Church of São Roque, Lisbon

Places

Brazil
Barra de São João, Casimiro de Abreu, Rio de Janeiro
Cedro de São João, Sergipe
Mata de São João, Bahia
São João, Paraná
São João, Pernambuco
São João d'Aliança, Goiás
São João do Araguaia, Pará
São João do Arraial, Piauí
São João da Baliza, Roraima
São João da Barra, Rio de Janeiro
São João Batista, Maranhão
São João Batista, Santa Catarina
São João Batista do Glória, Minas Gerais
São João da Boa Vista, São Paulo
São João do Caiuá, Paraná
São João da Canabrava, Piauí
São João do Cariri, Paraíba
São João do Carú, Maranhão
São João das Duas Pontes, São Paulo
São João Evangelista, Minas Gerais
São João da Fronteira, Piauí
São João de Iracema, São Paulo
São João do Itaperiú, Santa Catarina
São João do Ivaí, Paraná
São João do Jaguaribe, Ceará
São João da Lagoa, Minas Gerais
São João do Manhuaçu, Minas Gerais
São João do Manteninha, Minas Gerais
São João da Mata, Minas Gerais
São João de Meriti, Rio de Janeiro
São João das Missões, Minas Gerais
São João Nepomuceno, Minas Gerais
São João do Oeste, Santa Catarina
São João do Oriente, Minas Gerais
São João do Pacuí, Minas Gerais
São João do Paraíso, Maranhão
São João do Paraíso, Minas Gerais
São João da Paraúna, Goiás
São João dos Patos, Maranhão
São João do Pau d'Alho, São Paulo
São João do Piauí, Piauí
São João de Pirabas, Pará
São João do Polêsine, Rio Grande do Sul
São João da Ponta, Pará
São João da Ponte, Minas Gerais
São João do Rio do Peixe, Minas Gerais
São João do Sabugi, Paraíba
São João da Serra, Rio Grande do Norte
São João do Soter, Maranhão
São João do Sul, Santa Catarina
São João do Tigre, Paraíba
São João do Triunfo, Paraíba
São João da Urtiga, Rio Grande do Sul
São João da Varjota, Piauí

China
São João Island, an island in the province of Guangdong

Portugal
São João (Abrantes), a parish in the municipality of Abrantes
São João (Lisbon), a parish in the municipality of Lisbon
São João (Ovar), a parish in the municipality of Ovar
São João da Boa Vista (Tábua), a civil parish in the municipality of Tábua
São João da Serra, a parish in the municipality of Oliveira de Frades
São João da Madeira, a municipality in the district of Aveiro
São João (Lajes do Pico), a civil parish in the municipality of Lajes do Pico, Pico, Azores

India
San João (Goa)

See also
São João Baptista (disambiguation)